Eveline Tete Chelangat (born 6 August 1960) sabiny by tribe is a Ugandan Member of Parliament for 10 years . She represents Bukwo Kongasis Constituency as the woman MP. She belongs to the NRM (National Resistance Movement) Party in the National Assembly.

Academic 
She attended Bukwo Primary School where she sat for her PLE. Thereafter, she proceeded to Kidetok girls, Serere for her O level before joining Sebei college, Tegeres. She holds a diploma in social work from Nsamizi Institute (Mpigi). She is a social worker by profession and a Pentacostal by religion.

Political life 
Eveline Tete Chelangat joined politics and started from District Councilor LC5, in 2006 Bukwo District was given officially a district and she took up as women Representative to Parliament of Uganda under National Resistance Movement to 2016.

References

External links
Parliament.go.ug

1960 births
Living people
Members of the Parliament of Uganda
Ugandan Protestants
Ugandan social workers
Women members of the Parliament of Uganda
21st-century Ugandan politicians
21st-century Ugandan women politicians